Cap Norfeu is a cape at the south-east end of the Cap de Creus peninsula located on the Costa Brava in Catalonia, Spain, between Roses and Cadaqués. It is located between the bays badia de Jóncols to the north and badia de Montjoi to the south, at the end of a little peninsula.

References

Pablo de la Fuente, Les fortificacions reials del golf de Roses a l'època moderna, Figueres, Brau-Ajuntament de Roses, 1998, esp. pp. 293–308 i 316-317.
Josep Gesti i Perich i Joan Font i García, Cartografia digital de la vegetació i corologia d'espècies vegetals singulars de la reserva natural integral de Cap Norfeu (Parc Natural de Cap de Creus), Girona, Universitat de Girona, 2005.
Josep Girbal Lladó i Lluís Polo Alberti, "Flora y vegetación del Cabo Norfeu", Boletín de la Estación Central de Ecologia, 13 (1978), 3-22.
Arnald Plujà i Canals, Estudi del Cap de Creus: la costa. Diccionari toponímic, etimològic i geogràfic, Figueres, l'autor, 1996.

Norfeu